Giorgio Giomo (born 24 May 1949) is a retired Italian basketball player who won a bronze medal at the 1971 European Championships and finished fourth at the 1972 Olympics. His elder brother Augusto competed for Italy at the 1960 and 1964 Games.

References

1949 births
Living people
Sportspeople from Treviso
Italian men's basketball players
1970 FIBA World Championship players
Olympic basketball players of Italy
Basketball players at the 1972 Summer Olympics